Zeheba aureatoides is a moth of the family Geometridae first described by Jeremy Daniel Holloway in 1993. It is found in Borneo, Peninsular Malaysia and Sulawesi.

The wingspan is about 19 mm. The species resembles Zeheba aureata or Zeheba marginata, but is larger, less yellow in tinge and with somewhat broader borders to the wings.

References 

Ennominae
Moths described in 1993
Moths of Borneo
Moths of Malaysia
Fauna of Sulawesi